The Church of St. Francis is located in Évora, Portugal. It is best known for its lugubrious Chapel of the Bones. The Church was classified as National Monument in 1910.

Overview 

This huge church was built in Gothic style (with some Manueline influences) between 1475 and the 1550s to the design of Martim Lourenço, replacing an earlier Romanesque church of 1226. This church is one of a kind through its narthex with arcades in front of the church. The arcade is formed by seven arches with different forms (semicircular, pointed or horseshoe arches), a typical blend of Gothic and Moorish elements.

The battlemented façade has conical or spiral-shaped spires. The Manueline entrance to the church carries above a pelican, emblem of king João II and an armillary, emblem of king Manuel I.

The church shows majestic proportions : 36 x 34 x 24 m. The single, groin-vaulted nave gives a wide impression, accentuated by the white mortar on the walls and the columns. This is the largest nave of this kind to be found in Portuguese churches. The spacious vault of the crossing rests on ogival arches. The father of Portuguese drama Gil Vicente is buried at the left side of the entrance.

The chancel (early 16th century) with the main altar (from a later date) displays Renaissance features. But the choir stalls were made in different art styles : the right one in Renaissance, the left in Baroque style. The altars in the transept are decorated with gilded sculpturework (talha dourada) framing 16th century panels, probably painted by Flemish artists.

The sides of the nave contain twelve open chapels, built between the buttresses of the wall.

See also 
List of churches in Portugal

References

External links 
 Monumentos -  Convento de São Francisco de Évora
 

Buildings and structures in Évora
Sao Francisco Evora
National monuments in Évora District